Bladnoch (Scottish Gaelic: Blaidneach) is a small village on the River Bladnoch in Wigtownshire, Scotland, located just outside the county town of Wigtown.

The River Bladnoch reaches the Bladnoch Distillery which was established in 1817. The distillery sits on the North side of the river, just west of Bladnoch village. In 1798 this village consisted of 10 or 12 thatched houses on both sides of the road from Wigtown to the ford of the river. The inhabitants of the houses of that period were all labourers. The old ford has been unnecessary since the construction of the first bridge, near the distillery site, in 1728. In the 15th century a charter shows a request from Margaret, Countess of Galloway, for Papal Indulgences to be granted to any who would help in the building of a stone bridge across the Bladnoch. This was to help pilgrims on their way to Whithorn, as the existing wooden bridge was continually being swept away in floods. The bridge was not built until almost two hundred years after pilgrimages had finally ceased to take place.

At the south side of the 1728 stone bridge there was a public house which was known for its heavy drinking, rowdy behaviour, and fights. In 1743 the old innkeeper at "Blednoch Brig" was a man called Sawners McClurg. He allowed any kind of rowdy behaviour but fighting in his establishment. If a fight began "he reached for a thick stick which he kept handy, stood up, gave the ground a thump with his stick and said "Quietness is best". He was a strong man and, when he did this, everything was silent. A poem was carved on his gravestone:

Beneath lies Sawners McClurgEnjoying his quiet restWhen he was alive he ay said"Quietness was best".''

When the new bridge of 1867 was built the old stone bridge lay derelict. The new bridge was first discussed, according to the Free Press, in 1850. In 1867 the paper issued the news of its completion, and in 1868 carried an article reporting the costs of the finished work. The stones of the old bridge were eventually used by 1875 to construct a viaduct for the railway over the river to the east of the village.

By 1877 Bladnoch was a large village consisting of one and two storey neat slated houses, all of which had been built since the start of the 19th century. Industries in the village were McClelland's Distillery and McClelland's Preserved Potato Manufactory and Farina Mill. George McClelland, brother of Thomas and John McClelland who founded the distillery in 1817, founded the Starch Manufactory, Potato Mill or Farina Mill at Potato Mill road later. In 1842 it was described as being immediately south of Fordbank House, nearly half-a-mile north of Bladnoch Village. It was a considerable building of two stories high and built of stone, forty persons getting constant work there. At that time the factory and Fordbank House were the property of Charles McClelland. Fordbank was described as "a house of two stories high and built of stone." There were nearby small outhouses and pleasure grounds. In 1841 the works were described as "a Farina Mill with extensive chemical works where a large number of men and women were employed in day and night shifts of work." The Mill operated from the mid 19th century until after World War I. The ground on which it stood was on lease from the Burgh of Wigtown, and when the mill closed the land reverted to the Burgh and was sold for private building. In the Statistical Account of 1965 the Potato Mill is mentioned as having been demolished, and this being the cause for the drop in potato production in the parish. The last McClelland belonging to the Potato Mill was George McClelland who owned Orchardton House in Wigtown.

In 1877 there were many businesses in Bladnoch. There was a small coach building establishment run by Mr Withers, at which small or the largest coaches could be made at short notice. There was a large iron foundry owned by Mr William Anderson, a ship owner who had vessels trading to Glasgow and England. At his foundry all sizes of iron castings could be produced, again at short notice. This foundry (which stood near the present garage in Bladnoch) built boats which were put into the river at the site of the old ford, on the brae. Another Bladnoch ship owner was Mr Robert Bennett, proprietor of a large bakery in the village. He had a vessel which traded between Wigtown and Whithorn. McClumpha's drapery and tailoring establishment, run by father and son, made fashionable and substantial gentlemen's clothing. There was also Mr George Paton's joiner and cartwright's shop, a post office, three grocers' shops, two public houses, and a beautiful bowling green which had been gifted to the village by the Earl of Galloway. At this time transport consisted of two coaches daily travelling from Newton Stewart to Whithorn and vice versa.

The Friars from the Dominican monastery in Wigtown (founded by Devorgilla) had been granted fishing rights on the south side of the Bladnoch, and in 1526 James V gave them those on the north side in a thirteen-year lease. This lease was later turned into a gift. On the site of these fishing rights stood the town's grain mill. In or before 1471 the mill was destroyed by a flood, and it was not repaired until 1500.

In later years fishing rights became property of the Earl of Galloway. He owned the fishing rights for the whole river from its mouth to Torhouse for salmon fishing. In dry years, from ancient times, no salmon were able to swim higher than Torhouse. The 1791 Statistical Account states that rents for salmon fishing had successively risen from £9 to £16, from £16 to £24, and from £24 to £33. The salmon were not large and were taken from the beginning of March to the beginning of October. The best were taken from the river in June and July. As soon as they were caught they were sold, prices falling from 4d per lb to 3d later in the year.

There were several instances in ancient times of whales swimming up the river from the bay. In 1674 a large whale came up the river and was killed on the sands. It was a year of terrible famine and all the people nearby went to get pieces of whale meat. Oil from the whale was very good and was used to burn in oil lamps.

The buildings which were formerly part of Bladnoch Creamery stand on the south side of the river near the old ford. From this place the river flows in several wide curves until it passes Wigtown harbour. From there it flows into Wigtown Bay.

Villages in Dumfries and Galloway
Wigtownshire